Garrett Patrick Stubbs (born May 26, 1993) is an American professional baseball catcher for the Philadelphia Phillies of Major League Baseball (MLB). He previously played in MLB for the Houston Astros. Stubbs attended the University of Southern California (USC), and played college baseball for the USC Trojans. While there, he won the 2015 Johnny Bench Award as the nation's best collegiate catcher. 

The Astros selected Stubbs in the eighth round of the 2015 MLB Draft. He made his major league debut in 2019. Stubbs played for Team Israel in the 2023 World Baseball Classic in Miami.

Early and personal life 
Stubbs was born in San Diego, California, and was raised in neighboring Del Mar by parents T. Pat and Marti Jo Stubbs. 
Stubbs is Jewish, and was one of a record-setting four Jewish MLB players to appear in the 2021 World Series. Garrett and his younger brother C. J. were both active children; they began playing baseball at a young age but were also involved in music, art competitions, and theater. When Stubbs was a child, the only opportunity for children his age to play baseball was through a Little League organization, and so his father organized a traveling team for local players to continue their development outside of the Little League season. Additionally, Stubbs's step-grandfather Fred Shuey was a successful college baseball player, and Shuey arranged for a young Stubbs to practice his technique with former Major League Baseball (MLB) catcher Ed Herrmann.

Both Stubbs brothers caught for Torrey Pines High School. His younger brother C. J., who followed Stubbs through Torrey Pines and USC, was taken by the Astros in the 10th round of the 2019 MLB Draft, and has played primarily catcher in the minors, while also playing first base and corner outfield. During the baseball offseason, Stubbs lives in California with Matt Chapman, the former third baseman for the Oakland Athletics, and now with the Toronto Blue Jays.

High school
Stubbs attended Torrey Pines High School in San Diego, California. In high school, despite being small for a catcher, standing  and weighing only , Stubbs was a two-time All-California Interscholastic Federation Team honoree. During his senior season in 2011, Stubbs batted .391 with 27 runs scored, 13 doubles, and 18 runs batted in (RBIs). He earned both All-North County and All-Avocado League First Team honors as both a junior and senior.

College career 

Stubbs attended the University of Southern California (USC), where he earned a degree in policy planning and development with an emphasis on real estate, and played college baseball for the USC Trojans. In the summer of 2012, he played for the Peninsula Oilers in the Alaska Baseball League.

In 2013 as a sophomore, he was an Honorable Mention for the All-Pac-12 Conference team. In the summer of 2013, he played for the Plymouth Pilgrims in the New England Collegiate Baseball League, and was named a New England Collegiate Baseball League Eastern Division All-Star. Later that summer he played for the Cotuit Kettleers of the Cape Cod League. After his junior year, when Stubbs became eligible to be selected in the Major League Baseball (MLB) draft, he made it known that he intended to return to college for his senior year.

In 2015, his senior year at USC, Stubbs batted .346 (6th in the Pac-12 Conference) and tied for the conference lead in sacrifices (17), while coming in 3rd in steals (20), 5th in runs (51) and OBP (.435), and tied for 7th in doubles (15), as on defense he threw out 52.8% of attempted basestealers and made 3 errors in 468 chances. Stubbs won the Johnny Bench Award as the best catcher in college baseball, and was named the Pac-12 Conference's Defensive Player of the Year, Baseball America First-Team All-American, Rawlings First-Team All-American, and Jewish Sports Review College Baseball All American.

Professional career

Draft and minor leagues 
The Houston Astros selected Stubbs in the eighth round of the 2015 MLB draft. He signed with the Astros for a signing bonus of $100,000, and made his professional debut with the Tri-City ValleyCats of the Class A-Short Season New York–Penn League. After 11 games with Tri-City, the Astros promoted Stubbs to the Quad Cities River Bandits of the Class A Midwest League. He batted a combined .263 with seven home runs and 21 RBIs in 36 games with both teams.

In 2016, Stubbs began the season with the Lancaster JetHawks of the Class A-Advanced California League, with whom he was a California League Mid-Season All Star, before receiving a promotion to the Corpus Christi Hooks of the Class AA Texas League in July. Stubbs finished 2016 with an aggregate .304 batting average, along with 10 home runs, 54 RBIs, and 15 stolen bases in 18 attempts, while on defense he threw out 51% of attempted base stealers. He was named an milb.com Houston Organization All Star. After the season, the Astros assigned Stubbs to the Glendale Desert Dogs of the Arizona Fall League.

In 2017, MLB Pipeline named him the best catcher in the Astros' minor league system, and the organization's 11th-best prospect overall. Stubbs began the season with Corpus Christi, where he batted .236 with four home runs and 25 RBIs. He was a AA Texas League starting All Star, and in the game he tripled and drove in three runs for the winning South. Baseball America named him the best defensive catcher in the Texas League. Stubbs was promoted to the Fresno Grizzlies of the Class AAA Pacific Coast League in August, where he posted a .221 batting average with four home runs and 37 RBIs; between the two teams he had 11 stolen bases in 11 attempts.

In 2018, MLB Pipeline named Stubbs the 6th-best prospect overall in the Astros' minor league system. He played the 2018 season for Fresno, for whom he was a mid-season Pacific Coast League All Star.  He batted .310/.382/.455 with four home runs and 38 RBIs with six stolen bases in six attempts, in 297 at bats, while on defense in threw out 45% of attempted basestealers. The Astros added him to their 40-man roster after the 2018 season.

Stubbs batted .300/.333/.650 in spring training with the Astros in 2019, and was optioned to the team’s minor-league camp on March 9. He began the 2019 season with the Astro's AAA Round Rock Express, and was promoted to the major leagues on May 26. With Round Rock he batted .240/.332/.397 with 7 home runs and 23 RBIs in 204 at bats, as he stole 12 bases in 14 attempts. On defense, he caught 37% of attempted basestealers.

In his minor league career through 2021, Stubbs batted .272/.366/.397 with 27 home runs and 174 RBIs, and stole 51 bases while being caught only 5 times. On defense, he threw out 42% of all attempted base-stealers.

Houston Astros 

On his 26th birthday, May 26, 2019, Stubbs was called up to the major leagues after Astros catcher Max Stassi was put on the 10-day Injury List. Stubbs made his major league debut two days later, on May 28.

In 2019 he batted .200/.282/.286 with no home runs and 2 RBIs in 35 at bats for the Astros, as he caught 11 games, played left field in seven games, and played right field in one game, was a pinch runner in four games, and was a pinch hitter in three games. Stubbs had the fastest sprint speed of all American League catchers, at 28.0 feet/second.

In the pandemic-shortened 2020 season, Stubbs batted one-for-eight with a run scored and an RBI in 10 games, as he appeared as a catcher in 8 games, a left fielder in 3 games, a pinch runner in 3 games, and a pinch hitter in two games.

In the 2021 regular season for the Astros, Stubbs batted .176/.222/.235 with 2 runs and 3 RBIs in 34 at bats. Playing for the AAA Sugar Land Skeeters, he batted .265/.418/.363	with 25 runs, 2 home runs, and 15 RBIs in 113 at bats, as he had more walks (30) than strikeouts (29), and stole four bases without being caught. On defense with the Astros, he caught all three runners who tried to steal against him.

Prior to Game 4 of the 2021 World Series, Stubbs was added to the Astros' roster, replacing Jason Castro who was removed due to COVID-19 protocols. Stubbs played in Game 6 of the World Series.

Philadelphia Phillies 
On November 19, 2021, the Astros traded Stubbs to the Philadelphia Phillies for minor league center fielder Logan Cerny. At the time, Stubbs had developed a strong defensive reputation, including a 41% caught-stealing rate in his pro career, as well as strong framing rates according to Baseball Prospectus in his minor league career.

On May 22, 2022, Stubbs hit his first career Major League home run, versus the Los Angeles Dodgers off pitcher Tony Gonsolin. On June 15, Stubbs hit his first career walk-off home run against the Miami Marlins, carrying the Phillies to a 3-1 victory. 

In 2022 with the Phillies in the regular season he batted .264/.350/.462 in 106 at bats, with 19 runs, 5 home runs, and 16 RBIs. He played 41 games at catcher, four at DH, four as a pitcher, four as a pinch runner, two as a pinch hitter, and one in left field. He was on Philadelphia's 2022 World Series roster, though he did not play.

World Baseball Classic; Team Israel
Stubbs committed to play for Team Israel in the 2023 World Baseball Classic in Miami. He played for Team Israel manager and former All Star Ian Kinsler, and alongside All Star outfielder Joc Pederson, pitcher Dean Kremer, and others.

See also
List of Jewish baseball players

References

External links

Twitter page

Living people
1993 births
Baseball players from California
Corpus Christi Hooks players
Cotuit Kettleers players
Fresno Grizzlies players
Glendale Desert Dogs players
Houston Astros players
Jewish American baseball players
Jewish Major League Baseball players
Lancaster JetHawks players
Major League Baseball catchers
People from Del Mar, California
Philadelphia Phillies players
Quad Cities River Bandits players
Round Rock Express players
Sugar Land Skeeters players
Tri-City ValleyCats players
USC Sol Price School of Public Policy alumni
USC Trojans baseball players
21st-century American Jews
Peninsula Oilers players
2023 World Baseball Classic players